"Thank You for Loving Me" is a song by American rock band Bon Jovi. Written by Jon Bon Jovi and Richie Sambora, the song was released on November 6, 2000, as the third single (second in the United States) from their seventh studio album, Crush (2000).

Background and writing

In an interview on Top of the Pops 2, Jon revealed the title of the song was inspired by actor Brad Pitt's character in the film Meet Joe Black.

Chart performance
The song peaked at number 57 on the US Billboard Hot 100 and number 26 on the Top 40 Mainstream chart. It and also reached the top 40 in several other countries including the United Kingdom (number 12), Flanders (number 17), Germany (number 25), and Australia (number 34).

Music video
The music video was directed by Wayne Isham was filmed in Rome, Italy, at the Trevi Fountain.

Track listings

US 7-inch single
A. "Thank You for Loving You" – 5:07
B. "Bed of Roses" – 6:34

UK CD1
 "Thank You for Loving Me"
 "Captain Crash & the Beauty Queen from Mars" (live)
 "Runaway" (live acoustic)

UK CD2
 "Thank You for Loving Me"
 "Just Older" (live)
 "Born to Be My Baby" (live)

UK cassette single and European CD single
 "Thank You for Loving Me"
 "Captain Crash & the Beauty Queen from Mars" (live)

European maxi-CD single
 "Thank You for Loving Me"
 "Captain Crash & the Beauty Queen from Mars" (live)
 "Runaway" (live acoustic)
 "Just Older" (live)

Australasian maxi-CD single 1
 "Thank You for Loving Me" (radio edit)
 "Captain Crash & The Beauty Queen from Mars" (live)
 "Born to Be My Baby" (live)
 "I'll Be There for You" (live)
 "I'll Sleep When I'm Dead" (live)

Australasian maxi-CD single 2
 "Thank You for Loving Me" (radio edit)
 "Rockin' in the Free World" (live)
 "Just Older" (live)
 "It's My Life" (live)
 "Someday I'll Be Saturday Night" (live)

Japanese CD single
 "Thank You for Loving Me" (radio edit)
 "Born to Be My Baby" (live)
 "I'll Be There for You" (live)
 "I'll Sleep When I'm Dead" (live)

Charts

Release history

References

External links
 Thank You For Loving Me Bon Jovi Lyrics

Bon Jovi songs
2000 singles
2000 songs
2000s ballads
American soft rock songs
Island Records singles
Mercury Records singles
Music videos directed by Wayne Isham
Song recordings produced by Steve Mac
Songs written by Jon Bon Jovi
Songs written by Richie Sambora